Karen Pamela Gallardo Pinto (born 6 March 1984 in Valdivia, Los Ríos) is a Chilean athlete. She competed for Chile in discus at the 2012 Summer Olympics. She competed at the 2020 Summer Olympics.

Personal bests
Shot put: 13.48 m –  Santiago de Chile, 24 October 2009
Discus throw: 61.10 m NR –  Castellón, 2 August 2015

Competition record

References

External links

Chilean female discus throwers
Athletes (track and field) at the 2012 Summer Olympics
Athletes (track and field) at the 2016 Summer Olympics
Athletes (track and field) at the 2007 Pan American Games
Athletes (track and field) at the 2011 Pan American Games
Athletes (track and field) at the 2015 Pan American Games
Athletes (track and field) at the 2019 Pan American Games
Pan American Games competitors for Chile
Olympic athletes of Chile
1984 births
Living people
People from Copiapó
World Athletics Championships athletes for Chile
South American Games gold medalists for Chile
South American Games medalists in athletics
Competitors at the 2006 South American Games
Competitors at the 2014 South American Games
Athletes (track and field) at the 2020 Summer Olympics
20th-century Chilean women
21st-century Chilean women